Santa Maria di Gesù (Italian) is a Baroque, Roman Catholic parish church in Palermo, region of Sicily, Italy. It faces piazza Beati Paoli al Capo in the Capo quarter.

Documents assign the church first in 1489. It had been built adjacent to a church of San Rocco later Santi Cosma e Damiano. Documents list the church as belonging to the confraternity dei Neri, but by 1577, the church was affiliated with an order caring for orphan children. In 1648–49, it was granted to a congregation of Christian slaves, later to a confraternity ministering to porters conducting deliveries with animals. In 1660 it was refurbished under the dedication of Santa Maria di Gesù, but locally known as Santa Maruzza ri Canceddi.

The facade and layout is simple. The nave ceiling has a fresco depicting Saint Zaccharias. Other frescoes depict events in the life of Mary.

External links 
 Gaspare Palermo, Guida istruttiva per potersi conoscere tutte le magnificenze della Città di Palermo, Volume IV, Palermo, Reale Stamperia, 1816, pp. 63–65.

Roman Catholic churches in Palermo
15th-century Roman Catholic church buildings in Italy